Kirill Alekseyevich Folmer (born 25 February 2000) is a Russian professional footballer who plays for FC Baltika Kaliningrad, on loan from FC Rostov. He plays in the right midfielder position and can also play as a central midfielder or attacking midfielder.

Club career
He made his debut in the Russian Football National League for FC Spartak-2 Moscow on 11 March 2019 in a game against FC Zenit-2 Saint Petersburg.

On 13 August 2019, he signed a long-term contract with FC Ufa. He made his Russian Premier League debut for Ufa on 9 August 2020 in a game against FC Krasnodar, he substituted Igor Bezdenezhnykh in the 68th minute.

On 25 February 2021, he moved to FC Rostov in exchange for the rights to Konstantin Pliyev.

On 16 July 2022, Folmer joined FC Akhmat Grozny on loan. On 1 February 2023, he moved on a new loan to FC Baltika Kaliningrad.

Career statistics

References

External links
 
 
 
 Profile by Russian Football National League

2000 births
People from Engels, Saratov Oblast
Sportspeople from Saratov Oblast
Russian people of Volga German descent
Living people
Russian footballers
Association football midfielders
FC Spartak-2 Moscow players
FC Ufa players
FC Rostov players
FC Akhmat Grozny players
FC Baltika Kaliningrad players
Russian Premier League players
Russian First League players
Russian Second League players